This is a list of earthquakes in 1964. Only magnitude 6.0 or greater earthquakes appear on the list. Lower magnitude events are included if they have caused death, injury or damage. Events which occurred in remote areas will be excluded from the list as they wouldn't have generated significant media interest. All dates are listed according to UTC time. Maximum intensities are indicated on the Mercalli intensity scale and are sourced from United States Geological Survey (USGS) ShakeMap data. Alaska had the largest event of the year both in terms of magnitude and death toll. In March a great magnitude 9.2 earthquake struck the southern part of the state. This was the largest earthquake in United States' history and currently  ranks as 3rd largest globally. The quake and subsequent tsunami resulted in 139 deaths in total. In spite of such a large event there were only 11 other magnitude 7.0 + events which is below normal. Japan, Taiwan and Mexico had earthquakes which resulted in a number of deaths. Indonesia and Papua New Guinea experienced high activity this year with a cluster of magnitude 6.0 + events hitting throughout the year.

Overall

By death toll 

 Note: At least 10 casualties

By magnitude 

 Note: At least 7.0 magnitude

Notable events

January

February

March

April

May

June

July

August

September

October

November

December

References

1964
 
1964